The State Register of Heritage Places is maintained by the Heritage Council of Western Australia. , 38 places are heritage-listed in the Shire of Waroona, of which four are on the State Register of Heritage Places.

List
The Western Australian State Register of Heritage Places, lists the following heritage registered places within the Shire of Waroona:

State Register of Heritage Places
State Register of Heritage Places in the Shire of Waroona:

Shire of Waroona heritage-listed places
The following places are heritage listed in the Shire of Waroona but are not State registered:

References

Shire of Waroona
Waroona